East Griffin is a census-designated place (CDP) in Spalding County, Georgia, United States. The population was 1,635 at the 2000 census.

Geography

East Griffin is located at  (33.239156, -84.233786).

Demographics

As of the census of 2000, there were 1,635 people, 608 households, and 438 families residing in the CDP. The racial makeup of the CDP was 83.67% White, 11.87% African American, 0.37% Native American, 0.43% Asian, 1.59% from other races, and 2.08% from two or more races. Hispanic or Latino of any race were 2.57% of the population.

There were 608 households, out of which 34.0% had children under the age of 18 living with them, 49.3% were married couples living together, 17.1% had a female householder with no husband present, and 27.8% were non-families. 20.9% of all households were made up of individuals, and 9.7% had someone living alone who was 65 years of age or older.  The average household size was 2.69 and the average family size was 3.08.

In the CDP, the population was spread out, with 26.2% under the age of 18, 10.2% from 18 to 24, 30.4% from 25 to 44, 21.6% from 45 to 64, and 11.7% who were 65 years of age or older.  The median age was 34 years. For every 100 females, there were 94.6 males.  For every 100 females age 18 and over, there were 91.3 males.

The median income for a household in the CDP was $30,469, and the median income for a family was $31,544. Males had a median income of $29,102 versus $20,451 for females. The per capita income for the CDP was $13,041.  About 9.9% of families and 14.5% of the population were below the poverty line, including 17.5% of those under age 18 and 17.5% of those age 65 or over.

Notable Events in History
East Griffin was the final home to the infamous Crawley Brothers- George and Decatur. An account of their lives and the manhunt that brought them to Griffin can be found in the book "The Great Blue Ridge Manhunt- The Missing Pieces" by Evelyn L. Thomas.

References

Census-designated places in Spalding County, Georgia
Census-designated places in Georgia (U.S. state)